Linophryne arborifera, or illuminated netdevil, is an anglerfish of the family Linophrynidae, found in all tropical and subtropical oceans at depths below 1,000 m (3,300 ft) in the Bathyal zone. Its length is up to 77 mm (3 inches). The female is significantly larger than the mature, parasitic male.

Characteristics
The literal translation is Linophryne arborifera, which is Greek for “tree-bearing flax-toad.”  The female Linophryne has not only a luminous lure on the head, called the esca (Latin for “food”), but also a multibranched barbel hanging from the lower jaw. The barbel filaments contain many more bioluminescent organs.

At a length of up to 77 mm (3 inches), females are significantly larger than the males, which reach only about 15 mm (0.6 inches).  After metamorphosis they are black in color.  They have no scales and gelatinous skin.  They are different from all other ceratioid families in having dorsal-fin rays 3 (rarely 4), anal-fin rays 3 (rarely 2 or 4), branchiostegal rays 5 (rarely 4), and a sinistral (opens to the left) anus.   The eyes of linophrynid males are very well developed and unique among ceratioids in being tubular and directed somewhat forward. The nostrils of linophrynid males are also large and well developed.

Distribution
Linophryne arborifera is found in all tropical and subtropical oceans at depths below 1,000 m (3,300 ft).

Feeding 
Recorded prey of the genus Linophryne include fishes and crustaceans. Attached males obtain their nutrition from the female. They attach to the female with their jaws on her ventral surface. Blood vessels and tissues between them become integrated, allowing nutrients to pass from the female to the male.

Based on finding empty stomachs in captured free-living males, scientists think linophrynid males are unable to feed during their free-living stage after metamorphosis. Also, the “short and stout” denticulars of the upper and lower jaws of these males do not seem suitable for prey capture, and the alimentary canal is undeveloped.  Current understanding is that free-living males die after a few months if they do not attach to a female.

Growth and reproduction
In the family Linophrynidae, males are obligatory sexual parasites.  Attached males are nearly always found upside down, facing forward, and attached to the belly close to the anus. In all specimens found so far, only one male is attached to each female, which differs from some other angler fish species. Females without attached males and free-living males do not have well-developed sexual organs, so it seems that they must be attached for maturation and reproduction to occur. A 77-mm female Linophryne arborifera, with a 15-mm parasitic male, was observed to have numerous eggs embedded in a gelatinous mass (the so-called “egg raft” or “veil,” a reproductive device characteristic of all lophiiform fishes) protruding from the genital opening; the eggs, 0.6–0.8mm in diameter, are among the largest known for any ceratioid.

Bioluminescence

Several species of deep-sea fish have luminous organs used to attract prey.  Females of the genus Linophryne bear barbels containing luminous organs in addition to an escal light organ attached to the head. In L. arborifera, the top light organ has been likened to a pearl onion and contains luminous bacteria. The barbels, which look like seaweed fronds, do not contain bacteria but complex paracrystalline photogenic granules. The esca is ectodermal in origin whereas the barbel organs may be derived from the mesoderm.

References

External links
 
 
 Tony Ayling & Geoffrey Cox, Collins Guide to the Sea Fishes of New Zealand,  (William Collins Publishers Ltd, Auckland, New Zealand 1982) 
 Frogfish page on anglerfish, including linophryne arborifera
2002 article in Microbiology Today on bioluminescence in marine animals

Linophrynidae
Deep sea fish
Fish described in 1925